This is a list of members of the Tasmanian House of Assembly between the 2 April 1903 election and the 29 March 1906 election.

The Hare-Clark system being trialled in Hobart and Launceston came to an end at the 1903 election, and several seats in the rural region between the two centres either merged or changed substantially. Possibly the most significant result was the failure of the Premier of Tasmania, Elliott Lewis, to win a seat—formerly the member for abolished Richmond, he ran for the new Central Hobart seat, and was beaten by Herbert Nicholls, an opposition backbencher with only two years' parliamentary experience, by a substantial margin. The election also saw an increased participation by the fledgling Labor Party, which won four of the six seats it contested, all of which were in mining areas of the state. Future Labor premier John Earle was beaten in Waratah by four votes, whilst future federal MHR Jens Jensen and senator James Long also commenced their parliamentary careers.

Notes
  On 12 May 1903, the Ministerial member for Longford, Henry Dumaresq, resigned. Ministerial candidate Alfred Youl was elected unopposed.
  On 22 September 1903, the Ministerial member for Cumberland and Speaker of the House, Nicholas John Brown, died. Ministerial candidate John Wood won the resulting by-election on 9 October 1903.
  In November 1903, the Liberal member for West Launceston, David Storrer, resigned to contest the Federal seat of Bass against William Hartnoll, who Storrer had replaced in the Assembly the previous year. Liberal candidate Matthew Robinson won the resulting by-election on 10 December 1903.
  In July 1904, the Labor member for Lyell, James Long, resigned. He was returned unopposed on 13 July 1904.
  In July 1904, the Ministerial member for South Hobart, Robert Patterson, resigned. Ministerial candidate Stafford Bird won the resulting by-election on 30 July 1904.

Sources
 
 Parliament of Tasmania (2006). The Parliament of Tasmania from 1856

Members of Tasmanian parliaments by term
20th-century Australian politicians